Esenlik can refer to:

 Esenlik, Alacakaya
 Esenlik, Çaycuma